Abdülkadir Köroğlu (born April 22, 1991, in Trabzon) is a Turkish amateur boxer competing in the welterweight division. He is a native of Trabzon, where he is coached by Nazım Dalkıran.

Köroğlu was educated in physical education and sports at the Atatürk University in Erzurum.

At the 2008 European Amateur Championships held in Liverpool, United Kingdom, he won the bronze medal.

Achievements
2003
 Black Sea Tournament in Ukraine - 

2008
 European Amateur Championships in Liverpool, United Kingdom - 

2009
 National Championships in Çankırı, Turkey - 

2011
 Feliks Stamm Tournament on April 5–9, 2011 in Warsaw, Poland -

References

Welterweight boxers
Living people
Sportspeople from Trabzon
Atatürk University alumni
1991 births
Turkish male boxers
21st-century Turkish people